The Boston Historic District in Boston in Thomas County, Georgia is a historic district which was listed on the National Register of Historic Places in 2007.  The district then included 192 contributing buildings, five contributing structures, and two contributing sites, as well as 140 non-contributing buildings.

One contributing building is the Boston Methodist Church, built after a fire destroyed its predecessor in 1876, modified in 1909, repaired after a 1945 fire.

References

Historic districts on the National Register of Historic Places in Georgia (U.S. state)
Queen Anne architecture in Georgia (U.S. state)
Neoclassical architecture in Georgia (U.S. state)
Buildings and structures completed in 1860
National Register of Historic Places in Thomas County, Georgia